Makorongoni is an administrative ward in the Iringa Urban district of the Iringa Region of Tanzania. In 2016 the Tanzania National Bureau of Statistics report there were 8,151 people in the ward, from 7,790 in 2012.

Neighborhoods 
The ward has 13 neighborhoods.

 Baniani
 Kaguo
 Kibwana
 Mahagi
 Mahiwa
 Mkwawa Road
 Msichoke
 Muhimba "A"
 Muhimba "B"
 Pangani
 Pawaga Road
 Sekondari
 Tandamti

References 

Wards of Iringa Region